The 2011 West Dorset District Council election was held on Thursday 5 May 2011 to elect councillors to West Dorset District Council in England. It took place on the same day as other district council elections in the United Kingdom. The whole of this 48-seat council was up for election.

The 2011 election saw the Conservatives maintain majority control of the council taking 32 of the 48 seats up for election.

Overall results

Ward results

Beaminster

Bradford Abbas

Bradpole

Bridport North

Bridport South & Bothenhampton

Broadmayne

Broadwindsor

Burton Bradstock

Cam Vale

Charminster & Cerne Valley

Charmouth

Chesil Bank

Chickerell

Chideock & Symondsbury

Dorchester East

Dorchester North

Dorchester South

Dorchester West

Frome Valley

Halstock

Loders

Lyme Regis

Maiden Newton

Marshwood Vale

Netherbury

Owermoigne

Piddle Valley

Puddletown

Queen Thorne

Sherborne East

Sherborne West

Winterborne St Martin

Yetminster

By-elections between 2011 and 2015

Cam Vale
A by-election was held for the Cam Vale ward of West Dorset District Council on 2 May 2013 following the death of Conservative councillor Richard Jungius.

References
General
 

Specific

2011 English local elections
2011
2010s in Dorset